Postplatyptilia triangulocosta is a moth of the family Pterophoridae. It is known from Argentina and Peru.

The wingspan is about 20 mm. Adults are on wing in January and August.

References

triangulocosta
Moths described in 1996